The 1930–31 Michigan Wolverines men's basketball team represented the University of Michigan in intercollegiate basketball during the 1930–31 season.  The team compiled a 13–4 record, and 8–4 against Big Ten Conference opponents.  The team finished in a tie for second place in the Big Ten.  Joe Downing was the team captain, and Norman Daniels was the team's leading scorer with 152 points in 17 games for an average of 8.9 points per game.

Scoring statistics

Coaching staff
George Veenker - coach
Fielding H. Yost - athletic director

References

Michigan
Michigan Wolverines men's basketball seasons
Michigan Wolverines basketball
Michigan Wolverines basketball